Amas or AMAS may refer to:
 Amas Musical Theatre, in New York
 AMAS Awards, Spanish music awards
 American Music Awards (AMAs)
 Academy of Machinima Arts and Sciences 
 Amas, Bihar, a village in Gaya district, Bihar, India

People with the name 
 Knut Olav Åmås (born 1968), Norwegian writer and politician
Michele Amas (1961–2016), New Zealand actress, playwright and poet
 Amas Daniel (born 1990), Nigerian wrestler

See also 
 Ama (disambiguation)
 Amahs (disambiguation)
 Ammas